The following is a list of episodes of the public television cooking show America's Test Kitchen in the United States. The program started with 13 shows in 2001, its first season. Beginning with the second season (2002), the show grew to 26 episodes per season.

Series Overview

Season 1 (2001)

Season 2 (2002)

Season 3 (2003)

Season 4 (2004)

Season 5 (2005)

Season 6 (2006)

Season 7 (2007)

Season 8 (2008)

Season 9 (2009)

Season 10 (2010)

Season 11 (2011)

Season 12 (2012)

Season 13 (2013)

Season 14 (2014)

Season 15 (2015)

Season 16 (2016)
This is the final season hosted by Christopher Kimball.

Season 17 (2017)
This is the first season hosted by Bridget Lancaster and Julia Collin-Davison.

Season 18 (2018)
This is the final season produced at ATK's original test facility in Brookline, Massachusetts.

Season 19 (2019)
This is the first season produced at ATK's new test facility at the Innovation and Design Building in Boston, Massachusetts.

Season 20 (2020)

Season 21 (2021)
Due to the COVID-19 pandemic, season 21 episodes were recorded at the various cast member's homes with the shows being branded as America's Test Kitchen at Home.

Season 22 (2022)

References

America's Test Kitchen